Paterson F.C. was an early twentieth-century American soccer club based in Paterson, New Jersey.  It spent three seasons in the National Association Football League, winning one title, and one season in the American Soccer League.

History
In 1917, Paterson joined the National Association Football League, winning the 1917–18 championship. When several teams from the NAFBL left the league in 1921 to form the American Soccer League, Paterson did not join them.

A year later, Adolph Buslik, a wealthy New York fur merchant, purchased the club and the former Falco F.C. franchise in the American Soccer League. The club entered the league for the 1922–23 season. Following that season, Buslik moved the franchise to New York and renamed it the National Giants Soccer Club.

Year-by-year

Coaches
 John Ford (1919-1923)

References

 April 28, 1919 The Globe

New York Giants (soccer)
Defunct soccer clubs in New Jersey
American Soccer League (1921–1933) teams
National Association Football League teams
Sports in Paterson, New Jersey
1923 disestablishments in New Jersey
Association football clubs disestablished in 1923
U.S. Open Cup winners